The Mays Arena is a 3,500-seat multi-purpose arena in Columbia, South Carolina. It is the home of the Benedict College  Tigers basketball teams and was home to the Columbia Rottweilers of the American Basketball Association. 

The arena was also known as Mays Arena after De. Benjamin E. Mays.

External links
Official site

References

Indoor arenas in South Carolina
Sports venues in South Carolina
College basketball venues in the United States
Sports venues in Richland County, South Carolina
Buildings and structures in Columbia, South Carolina
Basketball venues in South Carolina